1 Leadenhall Street is an approved 36-storey, 183-metre skyscraper to be built adjacent to Leadenhall Market in London. It will replace the existing building located at 1 Leadenhall Street known as Leadenhall Court, and is expected to be completed in 2024.

Planning history
A planning application was submitted to the Corporation of London in August 2016. The description included with the application is as follows:

The planning application was approved in January 2017.

References

Skyscrapers in the City of London
Proposed skyscrapers in London